Aksakovo is a town in Varna Province, Northeastern Bulgaria. It is the administrative centre of the homonymous Aksakovo Municipality. The town is located on the Franga Plateau three kilometres northwest of the city of Varna. , it has a population of 30,576 inhabitants.

Aksakovo was declared a town on 27 May 2004. As a village, it was first mentioned in the late 17th century. It is named after Ivan Aksakov.

Municipality

Aksakovo municipality includes the following 23 places:

History 
The history of Aksakovo can be traced back to Thracian times.
Near the settlement is located the Roman fortress of Maglish which has had an important role for the development of the settlement and the defence of the region. 
After the Ottoman empire took over the Second Bulgarian kingdom, there was a decline in the Bulgarian population in the area. The village had predominant Turkish population and was called Adjemler (Persians).
When the San Stefano Treaty (1878) was signed, there was a mass exodus of Turks. The new population consisted by Bulgarian refugees that came from the region around Odrin (Edirne – now Turkey) and Lozengrad (Kırklareli – now Turkey). These refugees are called madzuri (маджури). The old Bulgarian population that was already living in this area is called vayatsi (ваяци).
On 14 August 1934, the name of the village was changed from Adjemler to Aksakovo. The new name is after the Russian publicist Ivan Aksakov who was actively involved in the process of the liberation of Bulgaria from the Ottoman Empire.

International projects: Europe for Citizens Programme 
Aksakovo municipality was awarded by the Ministry of Culture for its projects in the framework of the European Programme Europe for Citizens.  http://europeinfuture.eu/

Day of Aksakovo 
Each year the last Sunday of August is announced as the official holiday of the city and it is celebrated annually with events planned by the municipality of Aksakovo.

Religion 
The oldest and most important church in Aksakovo is an Eastern Orthodox one and is called Dormition of the Mother of God.

Industry 
The biggest factory located in the territory of the city is Plastchim-T. Plastchim-T is one of the leading privately-owned European manufacturers of biaxially oriented polypropylene films (BOPP), cast polypropylene films (CPP) and flexible packaging products. For more than half a century the Company has grown from a domestic type business to a leader in the packaging and packaging-related industry.
The production facilities and main office of Bulit Glass Ltd. which is a manufacturer of tempered glass, laminated glass, bent glass and insulating glass units are also located in the town of Aksakovo.

Sport 
The football club of Aksakovo is called FC Aksakovo.

Twin cities 
Aksakovo is twinned with:
 Cherasco, Italy
 Igualada, Spain
 Setubal, Portugal
 Taraklia, Moldavia
 Warsaw West County, Poland

Notable people 
Zachary Karabashliev (born 1968) – contemporary Bulgarian writer, Editor-in-Chief of the major publishing house Ciela in Bulgaria

References

External links
 Aksakovo municipality website 
 Information for all of the villages in Aksakovo municipality
 Information about the projects co-funded by the Europe for Citizens Programme of the European Union

Towns in Bulgaria
Populated places in Varna Province